Latin! or Tobacco and Boys is a play by Stephen Fry, written in 1979. It was first performed at 'The Playroom', an L-shaped space in St Edwards Passage that belonged to Corpus Christi College, Cambridge. It is about life at the fictional Chartham Park Preparatory School For Boys, a prep school in England, and ends up in Morocco, via a homosexual relationship between a teacher and a 13-year-old student.

The title derives from Christopher Marlowe's claim, reported by Richard Baines, that "All they that love not Tobacco and Boys are fools".

Characters

Central characters
Only two characters actually appear on stage:
Dominic Clarke: a young Latin teacher/schoolmaster in his mid-twenties — a character known for his 'sharp voice when teaching, but younger one when engaged in normal conversation'.
Herbert Brookshaw: a teacher/schoolmaster in his late fifties.

Students in Dominic's Latin class
These are referred to as if present, but their role is taken by the audience:
Rupert Cartwright: a semi-central character, a student in Dominic's Latin class.
Barton-Mills
Catchpole
Elwyn-Jones
Figgis
Harvey-Williams
Hoskins (deceased)
Hughes
Kinnock
Madison
Potter
Smethwick
Spragg
Standfast
Whitwell

Plot
While the audience is walking in, a teacher (Dominic) is seen on stage marking exercise books 'with three different coloured biros'. When the audience sits, the play starts. Dominic addresses the students (played by the audience), and after yelling at them, starts teaching, until Brookshaw enters.

After the students have supposedly left the room, Brookshaw enters. He explains to Dominic that he has been adding up merit-points accumulated by students, taking over the job for the headmaster while the latter is sick, and has noticed that one student, Cartwright, has gained an enormous number of merits. Brookshaw then explains that he knows the reason for these excessive merits. It turns out that Dominic has been taking Cartwright for 'extra Latin periods' in which Dominic engages in sexual liaison with the 13-year-old Cartwright. The headmaster's daughter has seen what has been going on. Dominic admits to this, and says that making love with Cartwright is the only way in which he can feel young.

Brookshaw says that he won't tell anyone about the illicit affair if Dominic sends all of his naughty students to Brookshaw himself, instead of to the headmaster, to be beaten; and secondly, if Dominic will beat him for two days a week with a wet towel and other curious objects.

When the students' Common Entrance Examination results are announced, Cartwright's score is curiously high amidst the general mediocrity of the class, and Brookshaw recognises that Cartwright's test paper has been corrected by Dominic. As a result, Dominic is forced to leave the school.

Later, Brookshaw is serving as acting headmaster while the headmaster is sick. He reads a letter to the assembly from "Ghanim Ibn Mahmud" and "Abu Hassan Basim", Arabic names adopted by Dominic and Cartwright. It turns out that Dominic and Cartwright have become Muslims; they now live in Morocco, and Dominic has adopted Cartwright. After the assembly, Brookshaw starts writing a reply to the letter, and the play ends.

Chartham Merit-adding System
The Chartham merit-adding system is the system in which boys are commended or censured, and are rewarded or punished as a result. If a boy is good, he gets a merit; if he is very good, he gets a 'plus', if he gets 3 pluses, he gets "free tuck" (which means free food),. Then, if the boy does very well in all fields, and shows "initiative far beyond his age", he gets a star, worth 25 points, and a 5-pound "tuck token". The opposites of these things respectively are the demerit, the 'minus' (if a boy gets 3 minuses, the boy gets no tuck at all), and the 'black hole' (minus 25 points, "offender eats crap, is caned; ritually kicked out by headmaster every morning").

Style
The play is known for its sexual explicitness, something of a trait of Stephen Fry's earlier writings. This type of writing is also seen in Fry's 1991 book The Liar.

Critical reception
The play was well received when it first played at the 1980 Edinburgh Festival Fringe, and it won the Fringe First prize.
Mark Cook of 'Time Out' Magazine said that it was a 'chuckle provoking piece', whereas Kieron Quirke of The Observer said that it was a play written by 'a clever 22-year-old seeing how many times he can say "bum" and still be taken seriously'.

Revivals
The play has had many revivals, including one at the Burton Taylor Studio in central Oxford, The Cock Tavern Theatre in Kilburn, and The Everyman Theatre of Canberra (Australia).

Edinburgh Festival Fringe
For the 1980 Edinburgh Festival Fringe, Latin! was performed at Riddles Court, Royal Mile, by the Cambridge University Mummers. The dates were 18–23 and 25–30 August 1980, at 5.15 p.m., tickets costing 90p. It was part of a double bill, the other play being written by Robert Farrar, then a fellow-undergraduate. It was directed by Simon Cherry, with Stephen Fry playing Dominic Clarke, and John Davies, a law undergraduate at Cambridge, playing Herbert Brookshaw. It won the Fringe first prize.

See also
Greek love, the philosophic underpinning of this sort of teacher-pupil relationship

Notes

References
Fry, Stephen (1992). Paperweight. London, England: Arrow Books. , The actual script.
Fry, Stephen (2010). The Fry Chronicles. London England: Penguin Books.

External links
https://web.archive.org/web/20110717044937/http://www.thinknoevil.com/latin_review.htm. The Reviews
http://www.edfringe.com/
http://www.australianstage.com.au/reviews/canberra/latin-or-tobacco-and-boys--everyman-theatre-2657.html
http://www.dailyinfo.co.uk/reviews/theatre/latin.htm
http://www.cocktaverntheatre.com/
http://www.stephenfry.com/

British plays
1970s debut plays
Plays by Stephen Fry
LGBT-related plays
1979 plays